Charles Binaux (2 December 1928 – 19 May 2001) was a French cross-country skier. He competed in the men's 30 kilometre event at the 1956 Winter Olympics.

References

External links
 

1928 births
2001 deaths
French male cross-country skiers
Olympic cross-country skiers of France
Cross-country skiers at the 1956 Winter Olympics
Place of birth missing
20th-century French people